Zhang Zili (born 23 January 2002) is a Chinese footballer currently playing as a midfielder for Guangzhou.

Career statistics

Club
.

References

2002 births
Living people
Chinese footballers
Association football midfielders
Guangzhou F.C. players
Chinese Super League players